Baba Mobaraki (also Romanized as Bābā Mobārakī and Baba Mobarakī; also known as Bābā Mobārak, Bābā Mobārak Hongdān, and Bīrāheh) is a village in Jam Rural District, in the Central District of Jam County, Bushehr Province, Iran. At the 2006 census, its population was 531, in 107 families.

References 

Populated places in Jam County